Eva Rönström (later Ericsson or Eriksson, 29 December 1932 – 7 October 2021) was a Swedish gymnast. She won a silver medal in the team portable apparatus event at the 1956 Summer Olympics. Rönstrom died on 7 October 2021, at the age of 88.

References

1932 births
2021 deaths
Gymnasts at the 1956 Summer Olympics
Olympic gymnasts of Sweden
Olympic medalists in gymnastics
Olympic silver medalists for Sweden
Swedish female artistic gymnasts

Medalists at the 1956 Summer Olympics
Sportspeople from Stockholm